Express: Aisle to Glory is comedy short film written and directed by Jonathan Buss, that was released in July 1998. It was the film debut of the actors Kal Penn and Brandon Quinn, both of whom have gone on to successful careers in the entertainment industry.

Cast
 Jay Michael Ferguson as Mark 'Dizzy' Gillespie
 Abraham Zucker as Mr. Kopenski
 Brandon Quinn as Charlie Murphy
 Margo Hara as Mrs. Watson
 Jean Speegle Howard as Grandma Gillespie
 Harry Kalas as Narrator
 Kal Penn as Jackie Newton

External links

References

1998 short films
1998 films
1998 comedy films
American comedy short films
1990s English-language films
1990s American films